is a railway station in the city of Shinjō, Yamagata, Japan, operated by East Japan Railway Company (JR East).

Lines
Shinjō Station is served by the Ōu Main Line, and is  the terminus for the Yamagata Shinkansen, Rikuu West Line and Rikuu East Line.

Station layout

Shinjō Station has one side platform and one island platform for the Yamagata Shinkansen. The Ōu Main Line uses half of this island platform, and one of two opposed side platforms. The other side platform is used by the Rikuu West Line. The Rikuu East line uses a notch in one of the side platforms, forming a bay platform. The station has a "Midori no Madoguchi" staffed ticket office and a View Plaza travel agency.

Platforms

 Platforms 1 and 2 serve  tracks, while platforms 3 to 5 serve narrow gauge (1,067 mm) tracks.

History
Shinjō Station opened on 11 June 1903. The station was absorbed into the JR East network upon the privatization of JNR on 1 April 1987. A new station building was completed in October 1998. From 4 December 1999, the station became the terminus of the Yamagata Shinkansen, following its extension from Yamagata.

Passenger statistics
In fiscal 2018, the station was used by an average of 1,393 passengers daily (boarding passengers only). The passenger figures for previous years are as shown below.

Surrounding area
 Shinjō City Hall
 Shinjō Post Office

References

External links

 JR East Station information 

Railway stations in Yamagata Prefecture
Ōu Main Line
Yamagata Shinkansen
Rikuu East Line
Rikuu West Line
Railway stations in Japan opened in 1903
Shinjō, Yamagata